The Shah-i-Kot Valley (also Shahi-Kot, Shah-e-Kot and other variant spellings) is a valley in the Paktia province of Afghanistan, southeast of the town of Zormat. Shah-i-Kot means "Place of the King" and it has historically been a redoubt for Afghan guerrillas hiding from foreign invaders.

History
The area was the scene of fierce fighting between the Afghan mujahideen rebels and Soviet forces during the Soviet–Afghan War, as the battle for Hill 3234.

In 2002 the valley was also the scene of Operation Anaconda, one of the largest battles of the War in Afghanistan.

See also
 Khost-Gardez Pass

References

Valleys of Afghanistan
Wars involving the Taliban
Landforms of Paktia Province